Kristina Dörfer (born 26 July 1984), also known by the stage name KR!S or Kris, is a German singer and television actress.

Biography
Born in Wurzen, East Germany, Dörfer was the older of two children. She and her younger brother grew up with their mother in Wurzen until she was 18 years old. Dörfer learned to play the violin at primary school. She performed as a singer for the first time when she was 10 years old in her hometown, and after that she was hired for various events in the region.

In 2002, she reached the "Top 20" at RTL II for the show Teenstar. In the same year, she was presented with the Bravo Award for the project 1000 Schulen in Bewegung. The presentation was in Europa-Park and had an audience of 10.000.

In 2003, Dörfer was a candidate in the RTL show Deutschland sucht den Superstar, which was the German edition of Pop Idol, reaching the "Top 50" stage.

After moving to the Ruhr Area, Dörfer started her professional singing career in two bands in the Dortmund area in parallel. With the Soulsukkers, she sang soul music, and with Soundset, a cover band, she sang rock and pop music.

The following year, Dörfer was selected by ProSieben for the Popstars – Jetzt oder nie! program, and on 8 December 2004 was chosen as a member of the band created by the series, Nu Pagadi. The first single of the band, "Sweetest Poison" reached number one in the German charts. The first album, Your Dark Side, reached number one in the German charts for one week. The band broke up in September 2005, nine months after being formed.

Dörfer, who had moved to Munich at the beginning of 2005, started a solo career from October 2005. She was given a contract by Edel Music. After appearing in concerts in various countries in Europe, her first single, "Room for More", was released in October 2006. The single reached number 10 in the charts in Finland and number 51 in the Czech Republic. Škoda used the song for advertising the Roomster model.

She has played Olivia Schneider in the ARD series Verbotene Liebe since December 2006.

In 2008, she was a member of the casting jury for the musical Frühlings Erwachen, the German language edition of Spring Awakening. In 2010, she and Joscha Kiefer (her former co-worker on "Verbotene Liebe") had a daughter. Her second daughter was born in April 2013.

Discography

Singles
 2006: "Room for More"
CZ: 51 – 44/2006 – 1 week
FI: 10 – 42/2006 – 2 weeks

Filmography 
 Since 2006: Verbotene Liebe (Olivia Schneider)

References

External links
 Kristina Dörfer official website
 Kristina Dörfer official Myspace page
 

1984 births
Living people
People from Wurzen
German television actresses
Deutschland sucht den Superstar participants
German soap opera actresses
21st-century German women singers